Miss Venezuela 1971 was 18th edition of Miss Venezuela pageant held at Teatro Nacional in Caracas, Venezuela, on June 17, 1971. The winner of the pageant was Jeannette Donzella, Miss Monagas.

It was the last year where RCTV was the official broadcaster of the pageant (since 1962).

Results
Miss Venezuela 1971 - Jeannette Donzella (Miss Monagas)
1st runner-up - Ana Maria Padrón (Miss Carabobo)
2nd runner-up - Dubravska Purkarevic (Miss Nueva Esparta)
3rd runner-up - Raquel Santi (Miss Guárico)
4th runner-up - Dalia Aguirre  (Miss Barinas)

Special Awards
 Miss Fotogénica (Miss Photogenic) - Jeannette Donzella (Miss Monagas)
 Miss Simpatía (Miss Congeniality) - Janice Salicetti (Miss Bolívar)
 Miss Sonrisa (Best Smile) - Miriam Callegari (Miss Falcón)

Delegates

 Miss Anzoátegui - Milagros Orsini
 Miss Apure - Yolanda Bramble
 Miss Aragua - Iris Camacho
 Miss Barinas - Dalia Carolina Aguirre
 Miss Bolívar - Janice Salicetti
 Miss Carabobo - Ana Maria Padrón Ibarranda
 Miss Departamento Vargas - Zoraida Bello
 Miss Distrito Federal - Dora Laforest
 Miss Falcón - Miriam Callegari Pérez
 Miss Guárico - Raquel Santi Hurtado
 Miss Lara - Laly Matheus
 Miss Mérida - Anita Carmona Sánchez
 Miss Miranda  - Zenda Ríos Lozada †
 Miss Monagas - Jeannette Donzella Sánchez
 Miss Nueva Esparta - Maria Dubravska Purkarevic

External links
Miss Venezuela official website

1971 beauty pageants
1971 in Venezuela